Gifford is an unincorporated community in Nez Perce County, Idaho, United States. The community was platted in 1901 by Seth Gifford, a homesteader who moved to the area six years earlier. Gifford had a post office from 1901 until 1965 and a school from 1896 until 1961.

History
Gifford's population was estimated at 50 in 1909, and was also 50 in 1960.

References

Unincorporated communities in Nez Perce County, Idaho
Unincorporated communities in Idaho